Chaumot is the name of the following communes in France:

 Chaumot, Nièvre, in the Nièvre department
 Chaumot, Yonne, in the Yonne department